Crouch Mesa is an unincorporated community and census-designated place (CDP) in San Juan County, New Mexico, United States. It was first listed as a CDP prior to the 2020 census.

The CDP is in northeastern San Juan County, bordered to the southwest by the city of Farmington and to the south by Lee Acres. Crouch Mesa Road (County Road 350) is the main route through the community, leading south  to U.S. Route 64 in Lee Acres and north  to State Road 516 in Flora Vista.

Demographics

Education
Crouch Mesa is divided between Farmington Municipal Schools (the majority) and Aztec Municipal Schools (a minority section). Aztec High School is the local high school of the latter.

References 

Census-designated places in San Juan County, New Mexico
Census-designated places in New Mexico